Runaway Grooms is a Canadian documentary film, directed by Ali Kazimi and released in 2005. An examination of the dowry system in India, the film explores the phenomenon of Indo-Canadian men who fraudulently return to India ostensibly seeking women to marry, but then abandon the woman and return to Canada without her as soon as they have secured possession of her dowry.

The film premiered on April 20, 2005, as an episode of CBC Television's documentary series The Passionate Eye.

It won the Donald Brittain Award for Best Social or Political Documentary Program at the 20th Gemini Awards.

References

External links 
 

2005 films
2005 documentary films
Donald Brittain Award winning shows
CBC Television original films
Canadian documentary television films
2000s English-language films
Films directed by Ali Kazimi
2000s Canadian films